Make a Match was a Canadian game show television series which aired on CBC Television from 1954 to 1955.

Premise
In each episode of this Montreal-produced series, a four-person panel was faced with another group of seven people which included three couples and a seventh person who was frequently disguised. The panel attempted to determine who the couples were in the seven-person group. The panel itself consisted of male and female married people plus single people, also of each gender.

Scheduling
This half-hour series aired Saturdays at 7:00 p.m. from 6 to 28 November 1954, moving to the Tuesday 10:30 p.m. time slot from 7 December 1954 where it was broadcast on alternate weeks until its last episode on 15 February 1955. House Party was broadcast on the other Tuesdays.

References

External links
 

CBC Television original programming
1950s Canadian game shows
1954 Canadian television series debuts
1955 Canadian television series endings
Black-and-white Canadian television shows
Television shows filmed in Montreal